Karina Fernández Madrigal (born June 22, 1978) is a female athlete from Costa Rica.  She competes in triathlon.

Madrigal competed at the first Olympic triathlon at the 2000 Summer Olympics. She did not finish the competition.

References
sports-reference

Costa Rican female triathletes
Triathletes at the 2000 Summer Olympics
Olympic triathletes of Costa Rica
Triathletes at the 1999 Pan American Games
Pan American Games competitors for Costa Rica
Living people
1978 births
20th-century Costa Rican women
21st-century Costa Rican women